Kalathur.T is a Panchayat village in Karaikudi Assembly, Kannankudi union and Devakottai Taluk of Sivaganga district in the Indian state of Tamil Nadu.

Location 

It lies 20 km east of Karaikudi, 12 km northeast of Devakottai and 12 km east of NH 210, which links Trichy–Rameswaram Highway. The "Two small River" surrounds the village. The northern branch of the river is called Northern River(வடக்கு ஆறு) and the southern branch is called South River (தெற்கு ஆறு). The Devakottai – Aranthangi shortcut road passes throughout Kalathur, The Post Office is Mithravayal. This Place is in the border of the Kannankudi union and Sakkottai union.

Demographics 

Kalathur is a medium size village located in Devakottai Taluk of Sivaganga district, Tamil Nadu with total 224 families residing. The Kalathur village has population of 987 of which 508 are males while 479 are females as per Population Census 2011.

In Kalathur village population of children with age 0-6 is 98 which makes up 9.93% of total population of village. Average Sex Ratio of Kalathur village is 943 which is lower than Tamil Nadu state average of 996. Child Sex Ratio for the Kalathur as per census is 885, lower than Tamil Nadu average of 943.

Kalathur village has lower literacy rate compared to Tamil Nadu. In 2011, literacy rate of Kalathur village was 74.69% compared to 80.09% of Tamil Nadu. In Kalathur Male literacy stands at 87.28% while female literacy rate was 61.43%.

Religion 

Hinduism is the village's major religion. Two major temples, Ayyanar Kovil & Muthu Mariamman Kovil are in the village. Every year in Tamil the month of Aadi is the festival for Muthu Mariamman Kovil.

Agriculture
The main occupation in the area is agriculture. Local agriculture primarily depends on seasonal rainfall. One of the major crops is rice.

Transport
Government Buses (Rout No: 16) connect the village with Devakottai and Puduvayal. The nearest Airport is Tiruchirappalli Airport, about 100 km away.

Education 
The village hosts a government middle school (P.u.m.school, Kalathur). There are also schools and colleges in the nearby villages of Karaikudi and Devakottai. Transportation is provided for students to and from Karaikudi, Devakottai and Puduvayal.

Kalathur Data 

In Kalathur village, most of the villagers are from BACKWARD CLASSES (BC) and Schedule Caste (SC). The village Kalathur currently doesn’t have any Schedule Tribe (ST) population.
Work Profile

In Kalathur village out of total population, 609 were engaged in work activities. 8.87% of workers describe their work as Main Work (Employment or Earning more than 6 Months) while 91.13% were involved in Marginal activity providing livelihood for less than 6 months. Of 609 workers engaged in Main Work, 3 were cultivators (owner or co-owner) while 10 were Agricultural labourer.

References 

Villages in Sivaganga district